The LZR Racer (pronounced as "laser") is a line of competition swimsuits manufactured by Speedo using a high-technology swimwear fabric composed of woven elastane-nylon and polyurethane. The swimsuits are made in body-length; they compress the body and trap air for buoyancy. The LZR Pro and LZR Elite were launched on 13 February 2008; the higher-priced LZR Elite was replaced by the LZR Elite 2 in early 2014.  The LZR X, the most recent addition to Speedo's competition suit lineup, was launched in early 2015.  The technology is patented in Italy, and protected worldwide.

The swimsuits have been found to improve performance, and permitting their use in competitive swimming has been controversial, and led to changes in regulations. People have gone so far as to label their use as "technical doping". They were deemed to provide an unfair advantage to the wearer by FINA, which led to a ban on all swimsuits of a similar nature.

Design and development
The LZR Pro and LZR Elite were developed by Mectex, an Italian company, in association with the Australian Institute of Sport, with the help of Speedo's sponsored athletes. NASA's wind tunnel testing facilities and fluid flow analysis software supported the design. Both lines' aesthetics were designed in collaboration with the fashion brand Comme des Garçons.

The design result, called the LZR Racer, reduced skin friction drag 24% more than the previous Speedo swimsuit. In March 2008, athletes wearing the LZR Racer broke 13 swimming world records.
Much like other suits used for high competition racing, LZR Racers allow for better oxygen flow to the muscles, and hold the body in a more hydrodynamic position, while repelling water and increasing flexibility. The LZR Pro features vertically-stitched seams to minimize fluid resistance, while the seams of the LZR Elite, LZR Elite 2, and LZR X are ultrasonically welded to further reduce drag. The suits are manufactured at Petratex, a textile factory in Paços de Ferreira, Portugal; the technology is patented in this country. The LZR Elite and LZR Elite 2 include patented Core Stabilizer and Internal Compression Panels. Speedo also partnered with ANSYS, one of the world's leading engineering simulation software providers, in creating this suit.

Endorsed for competitive use by FINA prior to the Beijing Olympics, early case studies suggested that the LZR Elite was effective in reducing the racing times of competitive swimmers by 1.9 to 2.2 percent. Although all body-length swimwear has since been banned from FINA competitions, swimmers are still permitted to compete in LZR Racer jammers and kneeskins.

Marketing and results

The LZR Pro and LZR Elite lines were launched on 13 February 2008, with the LZR Elite being marketed as "the world's fastest swimsuit." It was the focus of Speedo's campaign for the 2008 Summer Olympics, spearheaded by Michael Phelps of the United States.  They created a holographic (visually generated) video of Michael Phelps wearing the suit which was displayed in London, Sydney, New York, and Tokyo on the day of the suit's release.

The Beijing Olympics were successful for those wearing the LZR Racer, with 94% of all swimming races won in the suit.  98% of all swim medals won, and 23 of the 25 world records broken, at the Beijing Olympics were won by swimmers wearing the suit. , 93 world records had been broken by swimmers wearing a LZR Racer, and 33 of the first 36 Olympic medals have been won wearing it.

A problem arose for the Japanese Olympic swimmers, who had exclusive contracts with swimsuit makers Mizuno, Asics, and Descente, preventing them from wearing the Speedo brand suits in the Olympics. However,the Japanese Swimming Federation subsequently decided to allow its athletes to choose their own suits freely.

FINA rule changes

Following the December 2008 European Short Course Championships in Croatia, where 17 world records fell, it was felt there was a need to modify the rules surrounding swimsuits. The combined effects of the LZR both compressing the body and trapping air for buoyancy led to many competitors who used the LZR wearing two or more suits for an increased effect. This led to some claiming that the LZR was in effect "technological doping".

At its meeting in Dubai in March 2009, FINA stipulated that swimsuits should not cover the neck, must not extend past the shoulders and ankles, and also limit the suits' thickness and buoyancy. In a statement, FINA stated that by avoiding all questions of fabrics, impermeability, and buoyancy, FINA chose to deal with this situation by simply ruling on the lengths of swimsuits.

In an abrupt reversal of opinion, the FINA Congress voted almost unanimously to revert its previous policy and ban all body-length swimsuits. The decision was taken in Rome on 24 July 2009, during the 2009 World Aquatics Championships.  The new policy states that men's swimsuits may maximally cover the area from the waist to the knee, and women's counterparts from the shoulder to the knee.  They also ruled that the fabric used must be a "textile" or a woven material and that a suit may not have any fastening devices such as a zipper (drawstrings on male jammers are allowed).  FINA did not specify what they meant by "textile". The new regulations took effect on 1 January 2010.

References

External links 
 

NASA spin-off technologies
Speedo
Sports technology
Swimwear brands